The concept of country, as an  identity or descriptive quality, varies widely across the world, although some elements may be common among several groups of people.

Rurality

One interpretation is the state or character of being rural, regardless of environment. It can be at direct odds with  quantitative measures of rurality such as  those used by governments for statistical analysis (which are often vague and poorly defined). "Country" in this sense is  subjective and often intuitive. It encompasses a broad base of ideas and perceptions that may differ at local, regional or national levels.

Social development
Identity is often localized within relatively isolated populations which, having distinct traditions of their own, can often be viewed as an  outgroup and marginalized by the dominant culture. Contrast between rural and urban realities not only produces measurable differences politically and economically, but also affects populations in terms of social identification. Country conceptualization shifts the focus away from the prevailing forces in society (usually centered in larger, metropolitan regions) and towards those on the periphery of society in remote areas and small towns. This transition causes rural populations to feel better connected with rural diaspora and more empowered. This conceptualization also highlights that rural culture does not necessarily depend on residing in a rural area, and may assist in reversing negative psychological consequences of marginalization.

Cognitive definitions 
Country is a  subjective state that perceives the rural experience as focal and inseparable to one's collective identity, regardless of location. This is often expressed in the  demarginalization of ideas, values or lifestyles held as being representative of such a character, although a concise understanding of Country is difficult because the essential elements are perceived differently among individuals and groups. It is sometimes also limited by more specific classifications, such as "rural working-class culture" or "southern culture".  It is thus better represented by its subjective symbolism, which recognises that individuals can continue to retain a sense of "ruralness" even in urbanized areas. As there is no definitive, scholarly consensus on precisely what constitutes Country, much of its discourse is manifested in the arts, and often described it in  romanticized ways. Country music can be important tool for reinforcing this collective identity.

This emphasis of non-material culture over material culture resonates with the rural experience as being represented through material elements rather than solely consisting of them.  Within the United States, country frequently transcends a close relationship with the Southern culture as a source of unity and empowerment of local, marginalized peoples who feel left out from the dominant culture. The preference to identify as country before more traditional means of classification, such as race or class, is reflected of self-determination theory. Country identification is one way in that an individual strives to better their association with others, by identifying in ways that are more advantageous to rural populations and not necessarily in ways dictated by mainstream society.

Meaning in different cultures

Australia

The Indigenous peoples of Australia, that is Aboriginal and Torres Strait Islander people, have strong and complex relationships with the meaning of country, several of which relate to self-identity. An individual to describe family origins and associations with particular parts of Australia. A Gamilaraay man, whose traditional lands ("country") lies in south-west Queensland might refer to his country as "Gamilaraay country". Australian Aboriginal identity often links to their language groups and traditional country of their ancestors. 

Land is of great significance to Aboriginal and Torres Strait Islander peoples, often expressed as "connection to Country". Country can be spoken about as if it is a person, and it  implies an interdependent and reciprocal relationship between an individual and the lands and seas of their ancestors. The relationship is enhanced and sustained by the living environment and cultural knowledge. Because everything is connected, animals, trees, rocks, land and sky all deserve respect. Past is connected to present, and there is a sense it is important to acknowledge and respect the country of other peoples, wherever one travels in Australia. The term "on Country", or "on [a specific people] country" is often used. Connection to country, "the most fundamental pillar of Indigenous identity", is a difficult concept for non-Indigenous Australians to understand, and disconnection from country has been shown to have an impact on Indigenous peoples' health and well-being.

The connection to country is frequently expressed in Indigenous art. Bill Neidjie, Gaagudju elder, expressed that it is by “feeling” country that a person is "made" (exists). Palyku woman Ambelin Kwaymullina: "Country is filled with relations speaking language and following Law... Country is family, culture, identity. Country is self."

Aileen Moreton-Robinson, Professor of Indigenous Research at RMIT University, has written that the sense of belonging, home and place experienced by Indigenous peoples of Australia stands in sharp contrast to that of non-Indigenous peoples, many of whom descend from the original colonisers. According to her, white Australians' sense of belonging is "derived from ownership and achievement and is inextricably tied to a racialised social status...", and based on the persistence of the idea of terra nullius. The deep spiritual connection felt by Aboriginal Australians is related to their continuing occupation of the Australian continent for around 60,000 years, and the belief that Aboriginal lore/law was created by spirit ancestors to look after the land and its people. Songlines perform several functions, including mapping routes across the continent and passing on culture, and express connectedness to country.

"Caring for country" is another term commonly used in an Indigenous context, defined as "participating in interrelated activities on Aboriginal lands and seas with the objective of promoting ecological, spiritual and human health". Caring for Country projects in operation across Australia involve collaborative partnerships between Indigenous and non-Indigenous people working to repair Indigenous lands and to preserve the environment using cultural knowledge.

A Welcome to Country is a ritual or formal ceremony performed at many events held in Australia, intended to highlight the cultural significance of the surrounding area to a particular Aboriginal clan or language group who are recognised as traditional owners of the land.

References

Further reading

Identity politics
Rural culture
Australian Aboriginal culture